Private money is a commonly used term in banking and finance. It refers to lending money to a company or individual by a private individual or organization. While banks are traditional sources of financing for real estate, and other purposes, private money is offered by individuals or organizations and may have non traditional qualifying guidelines. There are higher risks associated with private lending for both the lender and borrowers. There is traditionally less "red tape" and regulation.

Private money can be similar to the prevailing rate of interest or it can be very expensive. When there is a higher risk associated with a particular transaction it is common for a private money lender to charge an interest rate above the going rate.

Private money lenders
Private money lenders exist throughout all of the United States, seeking a chance to earn above average rates of return on their money. With that comes the risk that a private money loan may not be re-paid on time or at all without legal action. However, in the case of a real estate transaction the lender can ask for a deed on the property in their name & Insurance on the property the same as a bank lending money would require as collateral to help insure they be repaid in the event of a default on the loan or catastrophe to the property. In that case the lender gets the property and can sell it to recoup their investment. Private money is offered to clients in many cases in which the banks have found the risk to be too high or credit too poor. There are a few Private Money Lenders who offer a no credit check and loan amortization.

Private money regulation
Private money lenders must comply with state and federal usury laws. They are not exempt from banking laws. However they may be exempt from routine regulation such as banking exams etc. Further, if the loan is made to a consumer, the private money lender may have a limit on how many loans they may make in a particular state without being required to have a banking license. In the State of New York a private lender may make no more than five loans before being required to be a licensed lender.

It is not advised for residential homeowners and should be considered only for business capital and with the careful advice and oversight of an accountant and real estate attorney as the collection methods may be more aggressive in the event a borrower cannot repay. Private investors do not usually have the means or interest in long protracted workout agreements, and will usually go to court quickly as a means of recovering their monetary investment.

See also 
Hard money loan
Money supply
Peer-to-peer lending
Private equity
Venture capital
Loan shark

References

Banking
Credit
Private equity